Vexillum coloreum is a species of sea snail, a marine gastropod mollusk, in the family Costellariidae, the ribbed miters.

Description
The length of the shell attains 9 mm.

Distribution
This species occurs in Philippines.

References

coloreum
Gastropods described in 2017